School for Seduction is a 2004 British film directed by Sue Heel. The plot involves an Italian temptress (played by Kelly Brook) who arrives at a school in Newcastle to teach a group of Geordies about the art of romance.

Incidental music
Music in the film included:
 Slip Into Something More Comfortable - Kinobe

Cast
 Kelly Brook – Sophia Rosselini
 Emily Woof – Kelly
 Dervla Kirwan – Clare Hughes
 Margi Clarke – Irene
 Jessica Johnson – Donna
 Neil Stuke – Craig Hughes
 Tim Healy – Derek
 Jake Canuso – Giovanni
 Jody Baldwin – Gail
 Sharon Percy – Karen
 Sophie Dix – Receptionist
 Donald McBride – Jimmy
 Duncan Bannatyne – Derek's friend

External links 
 

2004 films
2004 romantic comedy-drama films
British romantic comedy-drama films
2004 comedy films
2004 drama films
2000s English-language films
2000s British films